

Max Kohn (born 17 November 1954 in Esch-sur-Alzette) is a Luxembourgian painter and sculptor.

Former student at the Institut des Arts et Techniques Artisanales of Namur (Belgium) from 1971 to 1974.

From 1975 to 1981, Max Kohn was a student at the art academy of Karlsruhe (Germany), where he studied sculpture on wood and stone, casting techniques, as well as painting and drawing.

Max Kohn has been a freelance artist working in the Grand Duchy of Luxembourg and France since 1981.

Single Exhibitions
 1985 Galerie Weißer Stern, Karlsruhe (D)
 1987 Galerie Artemos, Bastogne (B)
 1988 Maison Communale Bastogne (B)
 1991 Galerie Artline Clervaux (L)
 1993 Galerie Dat Huisken, Bad Salzuflen (D)
 1997 Dexia-Bil Diekirch (L)
 1998 Galerie Schortgen Esch-sur-Alzette (L)
 1999 Galerie Aradia Hesperange (L)
 1999 Galerie St Nicolas Remich (L)
 1999 Tendance Mikado Luxembourg
 2000 Galerie Harald Lang, Sarrebruck (D)
 2000 Musée d’Histoire Naturelle (L)
 2001 Galerie Noodlebärg Basel (CH)
 2001 Bankhaus Trinkaus und Burckhardt (L)
 2002 Tour Mahuet Labry, Lorraine (F)
 2003 Galerie Michel Miltgen (L)
 2004 Château de Moncel, Jarny, Lorraine (F)
 2004 Galerie de la ville de Bar sur Seine (F)
 2007 Galerie Vergolderei von Wedel, Stauffen/Breisgau (D)
 2008 Hotel Rix (L)
 2009 Galerie Aradia Hesperange (L)
 2010 Galerie du Château de Bourglinster (L)



External sources
 Officiel Site of Max Kohn
 Fotos of Max Kohn in the photo archive of Tom Wagner

Luxembourgian artists
Luxembourgian sculptors
Luxembourgian painters
People from Esch-sur-Alzette
1954 births
Living people